Devapurage Shehan Madushanka Kumara or commonly as Shehan Madushanka (born 10 May 1995) is a professional Sri Lankan cricketer, who plays limited over internationals. He is a right-handed batsman and a right-arm fast medium bowler. He is a past pupil of Joseph Vaz College, Wennappuwa.

Domestic career
Madushanka made his first class debut against Zimbabwe Development XI. He made his List A debut for Kilinochchi District in the 2016–17 Districts One Day Tournament on 15 March 2017.

In March 2018, Madushanka was named in Dambulla's squad for the 2017–18 Super Four Provincial Tournament. The following month, he was also named in Dambulla's squad for the 2018 Super Provincial One Day Tournament.

In August 2018, Madushanka was named in Dambulla's squad the 2018 SLC T20 League. In March 2019, he was named in Galle's squad for the 2019 Super Provincial One Day Tournament.

International career
In January 2018, Madushanka was named in Sri Lanka's One Day International (ODI) squad for the 2017–18 Bangladesh Tri-Nation Series. He made his ODI debut for Sri Lanka against Bangladesh in the finale match of the tri-series on 27 January 2018. In the match, he became the fourth bowler and second Sri Lankan to take a hat-trick on debut in an ODI.

In February 2018, Madushanka was named in Sri Lanka's Twenty20 International (T20I) squad for their series against Bangladesh. He made his T20I debut for Sri Lanka against Bangladesh on 15 February 2018. In the second T20I, Madushanka took two early wickets in one over before sustaining a hamstring injury and was later ruled out from bowling. However, his injury didn’t affect Sri Lanka as they won the match along with the series. However, due to his injury, he missed out the Nidahas Trophy in March 2018, and several other bilateral series.

In May 2018, Madushanka was one of the 33 cricketers to be awarded a national contract by Sri Lanka Cricket ahead of the 2018–19 season. In December 2018, he was named in Sri Lanka team for the 2018 ACC Emerging Teams Asia Cup.

Drug Incident
In May 2020, Madushanka was arrested for allegedly being in possession of heroin and then suspended from all forms of cricket. He was carrying over two grams and 700 mg of heroin with his friend when detained in the town of Pannala by Police.

References

External links
 

Living people
1995 births
Sri Lankan cricketers
Sri Lanka One Day International cricketers
Sri Lanka Twenty20 International cricketers
Kilinochchi District cricketers
One Day International hat-trick takers